Gabriel Ruz (born 8 September 1950) is a Mexican former wrestler who competed in the 1968 Summer Olympics and in the 1972 Summer Olympics.

References

External links
 

1950 births
Living people
Olympic wrestlers of Mexico
Wrestlers at the 1968 Summer Olympics
Wrestlers at the 1972 Summer Olympics
Mexican male sport wrestlers